Nora is a feminine personal name. It mainly originates as a short form of Honora (also Honoria), a common Anglo-Norman name, ultimately derived from the Latin word Honor (with that meaning). In Hungary, the name Nóra originates as a short form of Eleonóra.

The Irish Nóra is likewise probably an Irish form of Honora. A diminutive form of Nóra is Nóirín; this name has numerous Anglicised forms, such as:  Norene and Norine,.

Nora has been among the most popular girl names in Norway in the 2000s, topping the list of most popular girl names in 2012.

In Finnish and Arabic there's a given name Noora.

Notable people with the name include:

People
Nora Arnezeder (born 1989), French actress and singer
Nora Aunor (born 1953), Filipina actress
Nora Barnacle (1884–1951), wife of author James Joyce
Nora Berra (born 1963), French politician
Nora Campos (born 1966), American politician
Norah Carter (1881–1966), New Zealand photographer
Nora Cortiñas (born 1930), Argentine social psychologist, activist, human rights defender
Nora Cullen (1905–1990), Argentine actress
Nora Demleitner (born 1966), American law professor
Nora Dunblane (born 1879), American actress and writer
Nora Dunn (born 1952), American actress and comedian
Nora England (1946–2022), American linguist
Nora Ephron (1941–2012), American writer
Nora Fatehi (born 1992), Canadian-Moroccan dancer and actress
Norah Flatley (born 2000), American artistic gymnast
Nora Gal (1912–1991), Russian translator
Nora Trueblood Gause, (1851-1955), American humanitarian
Nora Gjakova (born 1992), Kosovo-Albanian judoka, Olympic champion
Norah Gibbons (1952–8 April 2020), Irish children's advocate and social worker
Nora Heysen (1911–2003), Australian artist
Norah M. Holland (1876-1925), writer
Nora Istrefi (born 1986), Kosovo-Albanian singer
Nora Iuga (born 1931), Romanian poet, writer and translator
Norah Jones (born 1979), American singer
Nora Kirkpatrick (born 1984), American actress
Princess Nora of Liechtenstein (born 1950), Liechtenstein princess
Nora Lum, known as Awkwafina (born 1988), American actress
Nora McDermott (1927–2013), Canadian basketball and volleyball player, coach and physical education teacher
Nora Mebarek (born 1972), French politician
Nora Méndez (born 1969), Salvadoran poet
Nora Miao (born 1952), Hong Kong actress
Nora Newcombe (born 1951), Canadian psychologist
Nora Nicholson (1892–1973), British actress
Norah O'Donnell (born 1974), American journalist 
Nora Owen (born 1945), Irish politician and television presenter 
Nora Perry (1831–1896), American poet and writer
Nora Perry (born 1954), British badminton player
Nora Roberts (born 1950), American author 
Nora Salinas (born 1976), Mexican actress 
Nora Cate Schaeffer, American sociologist and survey statistician
Nora Lawrence Smith (1885–1971), American newspaper publisher
Nora Sun (1937–2011), American diplomat
Nora Swinburne (1902–2000), British actress
Nora Tschirner (born 1981), German actress 
Nora Volkow (born 1956), Mexican psychiatrist
Nora Torulf (1903–1993), Swedish politician and author
Nora W. Tyson (born 1956), American admiral
Nora Waln (1895–1964), American writer
Nora Wattie (1900–1994), Scottish public health medicine and ante-natal pioneer
Norah Wilson (1901–1971), Australian Aboriginal community worker
Nora Zehetner (born 1981), American actress

Fictional characters
Nora from the film Pete's Dragon (1977)
Nora from the anime Noragami
Nora Allen from The Flash comic books
Nora Arendt in Spice and Wolf
Nora from Cytus II
Nora Batty, fictional character on the British television series Last of the Summer Wine
Nora Beady, fictional character from the Barnyard franchise
Nora Bing, fictional character in Friends
Nora Charles, fictional character in the Dashiell Hammett novel, The Thin Man
Nora Carpenter, fictional character in Final Destination 2
Nora Clitheroe, from the play The Plough and the Stars
Nora Estheim, fictional character in the video game Final Fantasy XIII
Nora Fries, fictional character in DC Comics
Nora Grey, fictional character in the Hush, Hush series of books by Becca Fitzpatrick
Nora Hanen, fictional character on the American television series One Life to Live
Nora Helmer, character in A Doll's House by Henrik Ibsen
Nora of Kelmendi, legendary character in the Albanian folklore
Nora Lewin, fictional character on the American television series Law & Order
Nora Mae Edwards, fictional character in the movie Graverobbers
Nora Reid, fictional character on the Amazon Prime Video original series The Wilds
Noora Amalie Sætre, fictional character in Norwegian TV show SKAM 
Norah Stoakes, fictional character in the Canadian young adult novel The Sky Is Falling
Nora Thunderman, fictional character the TV show The Thundermans
Nora Valkyrie from the animated web series RWBY
Nora Wakeman, fictional character in My Life as a Teenage Robot
Nora Walker, a character in the Netflix series 13 Reasons Why
Nora Walker, fictional character on the American television series Brothers & Sisters
Nora Baker, eldest daughter of 'The Bakers' in the film Cheaper by the Dozen
Nora Durst, a character from the American television series The Leftovers
Nora Darhk, fictional character in Arrow and Legends of Tomorrow.
Nora Dershlit, a fictional character from iCarly
Nora Gainesborough, a fictional character from True Blood
Nora Krank, a fictional character in the film Christmas with the Kranks

References

Feminine given names